Francis William Wilkin aka Frank Wilkin (1791  - September 1842), was an English engraver and portrait painter, and the son of the engraver and painter, Charles Wilkin. 

His early works were miniatures. His later works in chalk were exhibited at the Royal Academy between 1820 and 1841. At one stage he was inclined to producing historical images, but the lukewarm reception given his commissioned 1820 painting, 'The Battle of Hastings,' discouraged him from pursuing this genre.

Paget, who was Wellington’s cavalry commander at the Battle of Waterloo, regularly gave painting commissions to Wilkin. The painting shown here had until quite recently been catalogued as a "portrait of an unknown military commander". The Order of the Garter star, the Waterloo Medal and the Hussars uniform, clearly identify this as a portrait of Paget.

References

19th-century English painters
English male painters
1791 births
1842 deaths
19th-century English male artists